Bream Bay College is a secondary school in Northland, New Zealand. In addition to the central hub of the region, where it is situated, the school serves One Tree Point, Whangarei and Whangarei Heads to the north, the marae-based community of Takahiwai to the west, the town of Waipu to the south, and farming communities inland.

Notable alumni

 Scotty Stevenson - Sky Sports presenter and personality

References

Secondary schools in the Northland Region
Schools in Whangārei
New Zealand secondary schools of S68 plan construction